Aron Eisenberg (January 6, 1969 – September 21, 2019) was an American actor and podcaster known for his role as Nog on Star Trek: Deep Space Nine.

Early life 
Eisenberg was adopted into a Jewish family. He was born with only one partially functioning kidney, limiting his height, and received a kidney transplant at the age of 14. Eisenberg studied theatre at Moorpark College in Moorpark, California.

Career 
Eisenberg appeared on TV shows including Tales from the Crypt, Amityville: The Evil Escapes, Parker Lewis Can't Lose, The Wonder Years, and General Hospital. He guest-starred in "Motherly Love", an episode of Brotherly Love. Eisenberg was a recurring guest star on the '90s TV series The Secret World of Alex Mack, in which he played the character Jerry. He appeared in films such as The Liars' Club, Puppet Master III, Streets, and The Horror Show.

Eisenberg is most recognized for his recurring role as Nog, a Ferengi, through all seven seasons of Star Trek: Deep Space Nine. While this part called for him to appear under heavy makeup, he also appeared without makeup as a news vendor in the episode "Far Beyond the Stars". He also guest-starred as a Kazon called Kar in "Initiations", an episode of Star Trek: Voyager, and was a host and producer of the Star Trek themed podcast The 7th Rule. Stephanie Marceau of Screen Rant listed her 10 best Nog episodes of DS9: "Empok Nor", "Valiant", "Progress", "The Visitor", "Badda-Bing Badda-Bang", "Treachery, Faith, and the Great River", "The Jem'Hadar", "The Magnificent Ferengi", "Heart of Stone", and "It's Only a Paper Moon".

Eisenberg also performed on stage in such productions as The Indian Wants the Bronx, On Borrowed Time and Minor Demons. He occasionally directed for the theater, as in the 1997 production of On Borrowed Time and the 1998 production of The Business of Murder at the Conejo Players Theater. His final performance was in 7 Days to Vegas (2019).

Personal life and death
Eisenberg worked as a professional photographer, opening his own gallery sometime before 2013. In August 2015, Eisenberg was once again diagnosed with kidney failure. On December 29, 2015, he received a successful kidney transplant. On December 28, 2018, Eisenberg  eloped with Malíssa Longo. He was also a father to two sons.

Eisenberg died on September 21, 2019, at the age of 50.

Tribute
In the Star Trek: Discovery episode "Die Trying" that aired November 12, 2020, Eisenberg was honored by a flyby of an Eisenberg-class ship named the USS Nog with the registry number of NCC-325070.

Filmography

Acting

Film

Television

Video game

Producer

Documentary

References

External links

1969 births
2019 deaths
American male child actors
American male film actors
American male stage actors
American male television actors
Jewish American male actors
Kidney transplant recipients
Male actors from Hollywood, Los Angeles
Male actors from Los Angeles
Moorpark College alumni
People from Hollywood, Los Angeles
People from Simi Valley, California
Photographers from California
21st-century American Jews